Heterischnus is a genus of parasitoid wasps belonging to the family Ichneumonidae.

The species of this genus are found in Europe and Northern America.

Species:
 Heterischnus africanus (Heinrich, 1936) 
 Heterischnus anomalus (Wesmael, 1857)

References

Ichneumonidae
Ichneumonidae genera